The 2021 New Holland 250 was the 22nd stock car race of the 2021 NASCAR Xfinity Series season, and the 29th iteration of the event. The race was held on Saturday, August 21, 2021 in Brooklyn, Michigan at Michigan International Speedway, a  D-shaped oval. The race was extended from its scheduled 125 laps to 139, after three NASCAR overtime attempts. A. J. Allmendinger would survive the chaotic race and win, his third of the year and his 8th overall career win in the NASCAR Xfinity Series. Brandon Jones of Joe Gibbs Racing and Noah Gragson of JR Motorsports would score the rest of the podium positions, finishing 2nd and 3rd, respectively.

Background 

The race was held at Michigan International Speedway, a two-mile (3.2 km) moderate-banked D-shaped speedway located in Brooklyn, Michigan. The track is used primarily for NASCAR events. It is known as a "sister track" to Texas World Speedway as MIS's oval design was a direct basis of TWS, with moderate modifications to the banking in the corners, and was used as the basis of Auto Club Speedway. The track is owned by International Speedway Corporation. Michigan International Speedway is recognized as one of motorsports' premier facilities because of its wide racing surface and high banking (by open-wheel standards; the 18-degree banking is modest by stock car standards).

Entry list

Starting lineup 
The starting lineup was based on metric qualifying from the previous race, the 2021 Pennzoil 150. As a result, Austin Cindric of Team Penske would win the pole.

Race

Pre-race ceremonies

Race recap

Post-race driver comments

Race results

References 

2021 NASCAR Xfinity Series
NASCAR races at Michigan International Speedway
New Holland 250
New Holland 250